John Arthur Johnstone was an English footballer who made six league appearances as a forward for Port Vale in 1921 and 1922. He was the brother of fellow Vale player Harry Johnstone.

Career
Johnstone joined Port Vale in April 1921, making his debut soon after. He played three Second Division games in both the 1920–21 and 1921–22 campaigns, before he was allowed to leave The Old Recreation Ground.

Career statistics
Source:

References

Year of birth missing
Year of death missing
Footballers from Manchester
English footballers
Association football forwards
Port Vale F.C. players
English Football League players